Lauritzen Gardens are a botanical gardens and arboretum located at 100 Bancroft Street in the South Omaha neighborhood of Omaha, Nebraska. The gardens are open daily during business hours; an admission fee is charged.

History
The gardens began in 1982, following two years of preliminary planning. Construction started in 1995 on the rose garden. Other early gardens included a shade hosta garden, herb garden, children's garden, and spring flowering walk.

The  arboretum represents seven regional plant communities: prairie, savannah, oak hickory forest, maple linden forest, farmstead windbreak, marsh, and flood plain river margin.

Since opening, new garden areas have been added each year. The garden also features a parking garden and arrival garden with annual and perennial flowers. The festival garden, with colorful annual plantings and open lawn expanses, is the site of several annual events; the Victorian garden combines characteristics of both English and Victorian gardens; the Song of the Lark Meadow is reminiscent of Nebraska's prairies and is filled with wildflowers and the  arboretum and bird sanctuary contains seven regional plant communities and demonstrates how to attract and identify Midwestern birds. In 2003, the woodland trail, which winds through a native hardwood community and features hilltop overlooks, and the Garden in the Glen, a space with a stream, pools and small waterfalls, were dedicated. A rose garden staircase and woodland waterfall were 2004 additions. The Sunpu Castle Gate and Mt. Fuji replica were constructed on the site of the future Japanese garden in 2005, and the tree peony garden and English perennial border were installed in 2006. In 2007, the model railroad garden opened in July with an expansion opening in June 2008. The Garden of Memories opened in the Spring 2009.

Open since October 2001, the  visitor and education center includes a  floral display hall, an education wing containing two classrooms, and one of the region's only horticultural libraries. Additionally, the visitor center houses the great hall, community room, café, and gift shop. The floral display halls holds three major floral shows per year; the fall chrysanthemum festival, holiday poinsettia show, and spring bulb show.

The Marjorie K. Daugherty Conservatory, a $20 million greenhouse addition, opened in 2014.

Today, the site thrives near downtown Omaha. The garden hosted 220,000 visitors in 2015 and currently has more than 12,000 member households and 250 regular volunteers.

See also 
 List of botanical gardens in the United States
 Lauritzen Corporation
 Kenefick Park

References

External links 

Arboreta in Nebraska
Botanical gardens in Nebraska
Parks in Omaha, Nebraska
Tourist attractions in Omaha, Nebraska
1982 establishments in Nebraska